Aoria is a genus of leaf beetles in the subfamily Eumolpinae. Members of the genus are distributed in East and Southeast Asia. Food plants are known for only a few species, all of which were recorded from Vitaceae.

Four genera similar to Aoria are known: Aloria, Enneaoria, Osnaparis and Pseudaoria. Osnaparis is regarded as a subgenus of Aoria by some researchers. In a revision of the genus Aoria in 2012, L. N. Medvedev included both Osnaparis and Pseudaoria as subgenera of Aoria, and treated Enneaoria as a synonym of Aloria.

Species
Subgenus Aoria Baly, 1863

 Aoria annulipes Pic, 1935
 Aoria antennata Chen, 1940
 Aoria atra Pic, 1923
 Aoria bicoloripes Pic, 1935
 Aoria bowringi (Baly, 1860)
 Aoria bowringi bowringi (Baly, 1860)
 Aoria bowringi larvata Gressitt & Kimoto, 1961
 Aoria brancuccii Medvedev, 2012
 Aoria carinata Tan, 1993
 Aoria costata Tan, 1992
 Aoria cuprea Medvedev, 2012
 Aoria cyanea Chen, 1940
 Aoria fulva Medvedev, 2012
 Aoria fulvula Medvedev, 2012
 Aoria gracilicornis Chen, 1940
 Aoria heinzi Medvedev, 2012
 Aoria humeralis Medvedev, 2019
 Aoria marginipennis Medvedev, 2012
 Aoria martensi Medvedev, 2012
 Aoria nepalica Medvedev & Sprecher-Uebersax, 1997
 Aoria nigripennis Gressitt & Kimoto, 1961
 Aoria nigripes (Baly, 1860)
 Aoria nigromarginata Medvedev, 2012
 Aoria panfilovi Medvedev, 2012
 Aoria rufotestacea Fairmaire, 1889
 Aoria scutellaris Pic, 1923
 Aoria scutellaris rufipennis Pic, 1923
 Aoria scutellaris scutellaris Pic, 1923
 Aoria semicostata Jacoby, 1892
 Aoria thibetana Pic, 1928
 Aoria vietnamica Medvedev, 2012

Subgenus Osnaparis Fairmaire, 1889 (sometimes considered a separate genus)
 Aoria laosica Medvedev, 2012
 Aoria lushuiensis Tan, 1992
 Aoria montana Tan, 1992
 Aoria nucea (Fairmaire, 1889)
 Aoria pallidipennis Pic, 1928

Subgenus Pseudaoria Jacoby, 1908 (sometimes considered a separate genus)
 Aoria burmanica (Jacoby, 1908)
 Aoria coerulea (Jacoby, 1908)
 Aoria floccosa (Tan, 1992)
 Aoria irregulare (Tan, 1992)
 Aoria petri (Warchałowski, 2010)
 Aoria rufina (Gressitt & Kimoto, 1961)
 Aoria yunnana (Tan, 1992)

References

Eumolpinae
Chrysomelidae genera
Taxa named by Joseph Sugar Baly
Beetles of Asia